Shamma Al-Kuwari (born 1972) is a Qatari novelist and short-story writer.

Life
Al-Kuwari was born and raised in Doha. She gained a bachelor's degree in organic medical sciences, from Qatar University, and a master's degree from Hamad Bin Khalifa University. As a journalist, Al-Kuwari has written for Qatari newspapers including Al Raya, Al 'Arabi and Al Maraya, and written a weekly column for Al Sharq.

Works
 Nahnu nazra' al-hubb [We sow love: short stories], 1995. 
 Hatūn nūr al-ʻuyūn : riwāyah [Hatoon Noor Al-Ayoun: a novel]. 2015.
 Alqāk baʻda ʻishrīn ʻāmman : riwāyah [See you after twenty years : a novel]. 2016.
 Wardat wa-khams batlāt : majmūʻah qiṣaṣīyah [A rose and five petals: a collection of short stories]. 2016.
 Lā aḥad lī siwāki : riwāyah [Nobody but me: a novel]. 2017.
 al-Ẓill wa-al-ḍawʼ : sīrat fatá ʻabra zaman al-umniyāt : riwāyah [Shadow and Light: A Boy Through the Age of Wishes: a novel]. 2017.
 Yamlaʼ al-tasāmuḥ qalbī : majmūʻah qiṣaṣīyah lil-nāshiʼah [Tolerance fills my heart: a short story collection for young people]. 2017.
 Mughāmarāt Fahd wa-Rawḍah maʻa Aws : qiṣṣat muṣawwarah li-aṭfāl [The Adventures of Fahd and Kindergarten with Aws: An illustrated story for children]. 2017.
 al-Safīnah al-Fīnīqīyah 5252 : riwāyah [The Phoenician Ship 5252: A Novel]. 2018.

References

1972 births
Living people
People from Doha
Qatari novelists
Qatari women writers
Qatari short story writers
Qatari journalists
Qatar University alumni
Hamad Bin Khalifa University alumni